Flic Story is a French crime thriller released on October 1, 1975, based on the autobiography of the same name written by French police detective Roger Borniche. Both film and book portray Borniche's nine-year pursuit of French gangster and murderer Emile Buisson, who was executed on February 28, 1956. Directed by Jacques Deray, the film stars Alain Delon and Jean-Louis Trintignant as Borniche and Buisson respectively, supported by Claudine Auger and André Pousse.

Plot
Flic Story follows a nine-year pursuit of Emile Buisson through France during the 1940s and 1950s, and illustrates the pursuit as a battle of intellect, focusing on a growing rapport between Buisson and the protagonist Borniche. Deray's humanizing of the characters was a trait used in his other films, and was a popular counter-cliché concept in France during the 1970s.

The film story depicts Emile Buisson, following the death of his wife and child, escaping from a psychiatric institution in 1947 and returning to Paris. Buisson, who three years later would become France's public enemy number one, begins a murderous rampage through the French capital. The opening scene shows reluctant detective (flic is the French slang equivalent of "cop" in English) Borniche, who is given the case and pursues Buisson for three years, while the latter evades capture by killing informants and anyone else he feels may give him away. Borniche, who unlike his colleagues, prides himself in a methodical approach, hunts Buisson through numerous alleyway chases, rooftop pursuits, car chases and gunfights, while putting his lover Catherine (Auger) in danger.

When bureaucracy intervenes with Borniche's attempts, and politicians and the media begin speculating, he uses the assistance of another criminal, Paul Robier (Crauchet) to apprehend Buisson. The serial killer is finally captured after having committed over 30 murders and 100 robberies. The final sequences sees Buisson telling Borniche that he would like to "take a hacksaw" to the throat of his informer, prompting a critically lauded line from Borniche that he would not get the chance.

Cast
 Alain Delon - Roger Borniche
 Jean-Louis Trintignant - Emile Buisson
 Renato Salvatori - Mario Poncini
 Claudine Auger - Catherine (prototype - Martine Borniche, who in reality was not a girlfriend, but the wife of Roger Borniche)
 Maurice Biraud - The patrol of the Saint-Appoline hotel
 André Pousse - Jean-Baptiste Buisson
 Mario David - Raymond Pelletier
 Paul Crauchet - Paul Robier
 Denis Manuel - Lucien Darros
 Marco Perrin - Commissioner Viechens (his prototype is Commissioner Charles Chenevier, who was the chief of Roger Borniche)
 Henri Guybet - Hidoine
 Maurice Barrier - Rene Bollec
 Françoise Dorner - Suzanne Bollec
 William Sabatier - Ange
 Adolfo Lastretti - Jeannot

Production
Writers Bénédicte Kermadec and Alphonse Boudard worked with Deray on Roger Borniche's memoir in order to create the script. The film was produced by Delon, featuring cinematography by Jean-Jacques Tarbès and an original score by Claude Bolling. The film was shot and printed on 35 mm negative using spherical cinematographic processes, as was common with films produced through the 1950s to the early 1990s. Production began on February 3, 1975, 18 years after Boisson's execution, and the film was shot on locations in both France and Italy.

Foreign releases
Flic Story was released through 1975 to 1977 in the United States as Cop Story, Finland as Passi ruumishuoneelle and West Germany as Der Bulle und der Killer or Flic Story - Duell in sechs Runden. The film rated '16'  in Finland, Norway and West Germany, the latter downgraded it to '12' following the reunification.

Reception
Flic Story received mainly positive reviews from critics. James Travers of Film de France praised the film for a "quality feel and sombre mood" and the lead actors for "humanity and depth". Travers also noted several similarities to the films of Jean-Pierre Melville, particularly Le Samourai. Travers names the film as one of Deray's best, although the "end result isn’t quite a masterpiece". Other internet reviews noted similarities with Melville, and complimented the film for "unsentimental verve, intelligent pacing and refreshing honesty".

Susan Hayward, author of French National Cinema, also complimented the film, saying it departed from mainstream style. She gave particular praise on the differences between Flic Story and American films of the same genre, by the way Deray focuses on the intellects rather than the brawn of the two leading characters, as well as the understanding that grows between the two during "months of interrogation".

Gary Giddins, printing his review from the August 16, 2005 issue of The New York Sun, praised the film as "the most interesting and resonant" of Deray's work, and gave particular credit to Trintignant's "hair-trigger" performance. He also complimented the detail in the secondary characters, and said it was honest in its support for the death penalty. Giddins also, however, criticised the film's pacing.

Notes

References

 Cannon, Steve Popular Music in France from Chanson to Techno: Culture, Identity and Society, 2003 
 Giddins, Gary Natural Selection: Gary Giddins on Comedy, Film, Music, and Books, 2006 
 Hayward, Susan French National Cinema, 2005 
 Lisanti, Tom Film Fatales: Women in Espionage Films and Television, 1962-1973, 2002

External links
 
 Flic Story at the British Film Institute
 

1975 films
1970s crime thriller films
1970s crime drama films
1970s serial killer films
French crime drama films
Biographical films about French gangsters
1970s French-language films
Films directed by Jacques Deray
Films produced by Alain Delon
Films set in the 1940s
Films set in the 1950s
Films set in Paris
Films shot in France
Films shot in Italy
Police detective films
1975 drama films
Films scored by Claude Bolling
Films based on autobiographies
1970s French films